Cornwall Township is one of twenty-four townships in Henry County, Illinois, US. At the 2010 census, its population was 278 and it contained 119 housing units.

Geography

Cities, towns, villages
 Atkinson (partial)

Adjacent townships
 Atkinson Township (north)
 Alba Township (northeast)
 Annawan Township (east)
 Kewanee Township (southeast)
 Burns Township (south)
 Cambridge Township (southwest)
 Munson Township (west)
 Geneseo Township (northwest)

Cemeteries
The township contains these three cemeteries: Grand View, Liberty and Saint Anthony.

Major highways
  Interstate 80
  U.S. Route 6

Demographics

School districts
 Annawan Community Unit School District 226
 Cambridge Community Unit School District 227
 Geneseo Community Unit School District 228
 Kewanee Community Unit School District 229

Political districts
 Illinois's 14th congressional district
 State House District 74
 State Senate District 37

Notable people
 Art Benedict, baseball player (MLB second baseman for the Philadelphia Quakers)
 Joe McGinnity, baseball player (MLB Hall of Fame pitcher for the Baltimore Orioles, Brooklyn Superbas and New York Giants)

References
 
 United States Census Bureau 2008 TIGER/Line Shapefiles
 United States National Atlas

External links
 City-Data.com
 Illinois State Archives
 Township Officials of Illinois

Townships in Henry County, Illinois
Townships in Illinois